Princess Vanirattanakanya (27 January 1858 – 26 January 1936) was a princess of Siam (later Thailand). She was a member of the Siamese royal family, a daughter of King Mongkut and Chao Chom Manda Kaew Buronsiri.

Her mother was Chao Chom Manda Kaew Buronsiri. She was given the full name Phra Chao Borom Wong Ther Phra Ong Chao Vanirattanakanya.

Princess Vanirattanakanya died on 25 January 1936 at the age 77.

Royal decoration
  เครื่องราชอิสริยาภรณ์จุลจอมเกล้า ชั้นทุติยจุลจอมเกล้าวิเศษ (ฝ่ายใน) (ท.จ.ว.)
  เหรียญรัตนาภรณ์ รัชกาลที่ 4 ชั้นที่ 3 (ม.ป.ร.3)
  เหรียญรัตนาภรณ์ รัชกาลที่ 5 ชั้นที่ 3 (จ.ป.ร.3)
  เหรียญรัตนาภรณ์ รัชกาลที่ 6 ชั้นที่ 2 (ว.ป.ร.2)
  เหรียญรัตนาภรณ์ รัชกาลที่ 7 ชั้นที่ 2 (ป.ป.ร.2)

Titles
 Her Royal Highness Princess Vaniratanakanya 1858-1868
 Her Royal Highness Princess Vanirattanakanya, the princess of sister 1868-1910
 Her Royal Highness Princess Vanirattanakanya 1910-1936

References 

1857 births
1936 deaths
Thai female Phra Ong Chao
19th-century Thai women
19th-century Chakri dynasty
20th-century Thai women
20th-century Chakri dynasty
Children of Mongkut
People from Bangkok
Daughters of kings